Wanda Whips Wall Street (also known as Stocks and Blondes) is a 1982 pornographic film directed by Larry Revene and starring Veronica Hart.

Plot
Wanda Brandt, a corporate takeover engineer, plots to take control of a Wall Street investment firm by sexually blackmailing the corporate stockholders out of their holdings. Things get complicated for Wanda when the firm hires an investigator (played by Jamie Gillis) to determine the cause of the stock instability.

Production and release
Wanda Whips Wall Street was shot on film using a script as most better quality adult films were in the early 1980s. The movie showed up edited on venues such as the Washington D.C. areas long defunct SuperTv, an early afterhours only form of Pay-Per-View. The theatrical release of the film coincided with the beginning of the home video Beta/VHS era and the film enjoyed success and popularity on the home video market and still does on the DVD. Some production locations were used, one such obvious location had Ron Jeremy and Lisa Be in a scene on a boat in the middle of New York Harbor, a scene virtually impossible to shoot today with nearly every would-be passerby possessing a smartphone with camera.

References

External links

1982 films
1980s pornographic films
1980s English-language films
American pornographic films
1980s American films